The Moldova national rugby league team first competed into international competition in 1993. Moldova has not competed internationally since the 1995 Emerging Nations World Cup. Rugby league is no longer played in Moldova, even if a French author mentions that the game was still played in 2011, and while there were attempts to revive the national team for a tournament in 2003 (likely based on Russian players of Moldovan descent and Moldovan rugby union players) the team failed to materialise. There are no known current plans to resurrect the team, though rugby league has recently started in neighbouring Ukraine.

The Moldovan national side was largely based on the semi-professional Tiraspol side who played in the Russian Rugby League in its early seasons, where they even won some early titles, though at one stage there was also a small amateur Tiraspol league.

Results
 Moldova def. Morocco 24–19 (18 October 1995)
 Ireland def. Moldova 48–26 (16 October 1995)
 BARLA Great Britain Lions def. Moldova 33–14 (May 1994)
 France def. Moldova 34–14 (1993)

COMMONWEALTH OF INDEPENDENT STATES (CIS): 
 CIS def. South Africa 22–19 (1992) 
 CIS def. South Africa 30–26 (1992) 
 France def. CIS 38–4 (1992) 
 France def. CIS 28–8 (1992)

SOVIET UNION (USSR): 
 France def. USSR 26–6 (1991)

See also

References

External links

 
National rugby league teams